Sling is an area in the community of Llanddona, Anglesey, Wales, which is 130.4 miles (209.8 km) from Cardiff and 208.1 miles (334.8 km) from London.

References

See also 
 List of localities in Wales by population

Villages in Anglesey